Hamdiu & Shyhretja (alternatively Hamdiu dhe Shyhretja) is a Kosovar comedy web series directed by Genc Berisha, produced by GjirafaStudios, starring Besart Sllamniku and Edona Reshitaj as the title characters.

The first season premiered on January 10, 2018, on GjirafaVideo at 10:00 pm. The episodes were released all at once. The second season premiered in March 2018, while the third season premiered on September of the same year.

Overview
The series deals with the bizarre relationship between an Albanian married couple, Hamdiu and Shyhretja, with themes of love, jealousy, cheating, intrigue, and manipulation.

Cast

Main
 Besart Sllamniku as Hamdiu
 Edona Reshitaj as Shyhretja

Others
 Granit Ukaj
 Ftesa Hazrolli
 Vullkan Gacaferri
 Yllëza Mazrekaj
 Flamur Ahmeti
 Leunorë Makolli
 Arbnora Makolli
 Gëzim Rexhepi
 Veton Berisha
 Fitim Hajdari
 Agan Asllani
 Arjanit Hoti
 Verona Koxha
 Molikë Maxhuni
 Agron Demolli
 Anila Krasniqi
 Blend Sadiku
 Adele Gjoka
 Verdi Berisha

Guests
 Baby G
 Ana Kabashi

Episodes

References

External links
 Hamdiu & Shyhretja on GjirafaVideo

Comedy web series
2018 web series debuts
Albanian television shows